Liptena xanthostola, the yellow liptena, is a butterfly in the family Lycaenidae. It is found in Guinea, Sierra Leone, Liberia, Ivory Coast, Ghana, Nigeria, Cameroon, Equatorial Guinea, Gabon, the Republic of the Congo, Angola, the Democratic Republic of the Congo, Sudan, Uganda, Kenya, Tanzania and Zambia. The habitat consists of dense primary forests at altitudes between 900 and 1,500 metres.

The larvae feed on lichens growing on tree trunks.

Subspecies
 Liptena xanthostola xanthostola (Nigeria, Cameroon, Equatorial Guinea: Mbini, Gabon, Congo, Democratic Republic of the Congo: Kwilu)
 Liptena xanthostola coomassiensis Hawker-Smith, 1933 (Guinea, Sierra Leone, Liberia, Ivory Coast, Ghana)
 Liptena xanthostola xantha (Grose-Smith, 1901) (Sudan, Uganda, western Kenya, Tanzania: north-west to Kigoma and Mpanda, Zambia, Angola, Democratic Republic of the Congo: Uele, Ituri, Kivu, Equateur, Sankuru, Kasai, Lualaba and Maniema)

References

Butterflies described in 1890
Liptena
Butterflies of Africa